Topless is where a woman's breasts are exposed.

Topless may also refer to:

 "Topless", a song by Breaking Benjamin from the 2006 album Phobia
 "Topless", a song by Eminem with Dr Dre and Nas
 Topless (film), a 2008 Japanese film
 Topless (play), by Miles Tredinnick, 1999
 La Mouette Topless, French hang glider design

See also
 
 Topfreedom, a cultural and political movement for toplessness